Mohamed Al-Taay (born 15 June 2000) is an Australian professional footballer of Iraqi descent who plays as a central midfielder for Newcastle Jets.

Early life
Mohamed Al-Taay was born and raised in South West Sydney town of Campbelltown,New South Wales. He was born to both Iraqi parents who fled Iraq in 1989 following the Iran-Iraq War.

Club career

Blacktown City FC

Mohamed, started his football career with Blacktown City FC in 2012 at the age of 12 until 2016 when he was 16. Mohamed quickly excelled through the clubs system playing in older age groups. He originally started as a centre  back and also played as a right back.

Marconi Stallions FC  

In 2016 he moved to Marconi Stallions FC after being scouted by Paul Okon. He played a full season at the club and represented the u20 Marconi Side at the age of 16. Mohamed primarily played as a centre back and central midfielder through his time there. 

Western Sydney Wanderers 

After a successful season with Marconi Stallions FC in 2017 Mohamed made a move to Western Sydney Wanderers after being scouted by Ian Crook.  Under then youth team coach Trevor Morgan, Mohamed played in the youth team setup. Mohamed was made captain in 2019 of the Youth team and was selected as Western Sydney Wanderers Youth team player of the year. This brought attention to the first team coach Carl Robinson who signed Mohamed into the first team. 

Newcastle Jets 

In 2021-2022 season Mohamed was signed by  Newcastle Jets under the leadership of Arthur Papas. He made his senior A-League debut against Sydney FC coming on in the 77th minute. In the 2021-2022 season he made a total of 12 appearances for the Jets.

References

External links

Living people
2000 births
Australian soccer players
Association football midfielders
Western Sydney Wanderers FC players
Newcastle Jets FC players
A-League Men players
National Premier Leagues players
Australian people of Iraqi descent